"Lonely" is a song by Senegalese-American singer-songwriter Akon; it appears on his debut album, Trouble. Featuring a prominent, high-pitched sample of the 1964 song "Mr. Lonely" by Bobby Vinton, the single was released on February 22, 2005. "Lonely" reached number one in several countries, including in the United Kingdom, Australia, and Germany, where it stayed for eight weeks. It also entered the top five in France, where it reached number two, and in the United States, where it peaked at number four.

Background
When Akon was signed by Universal imprint SRC Records it was "Lonely" that had immediately caught the attention of SRC A&R Jerome Foster and convinced him of Akon's talents. On hearing the demo track he had said, "This kid is official - this is a huge record." Despite offering the album's best option in terms of commercial breakthrough, SRC Records chose "Locked Up" over "Lonely" as the first single because SRC wanted to break Akon in the streets first and work towards a cross-over. According to Foster in an interview with HitQuarters, ""Locked Up" is a street record. I thought that was the place for us to start to get a fan-base knowing that we had a record like "Lonely", which was more commercial, to follow it."

The song was written by Akon, Bobby Vinton, and Gene Allan. The lyrics are sung mainly by Akon as well as Bobby Vinton doing parts of the choruses. The song's tempo is 90 beats per minute in common time. "Lonely" is written in the key of C major.

Music video
A music video was produced to promote the single. The video was directed by Gil Green. Actress Katerina Graham starred in the video as Akon's love partner. A competition winner from Blackpool, Daniel Ellwood, also starred in the video.

Track listings
UK CD1
 "Lonely" (clean version) – 3:58
 "Trouble Nobody" (explicit) – 3:21

UK CD2
 "Lonely" (UK radio edit) – 3:33
 "Trouble Nobody" (clean) – 3:21
 "Kill the Dance (Got Something for Ya)" (featuring Kardinal Offishall) – 2:54
 "Lonely" (video) – 3:58

US CD single
 "Lonely" (clean version) – 3:58
 "Lonely" (instrumental version) – 3:58
 "Belly Dancer (Bananza)" (snippet) – 1:31

Charts
The song was a number-one hit in several countries, including Australia, Austria, Denmark, the Netherlands, New Zealand, Belgium, and Switzerland. The song reached number two in France, Norway, and Sweden. The song also reached number 19 in Finland.

Weekly charts

Year-end charts

Decade-end charts

Certifications

Release history

References

External links
 

2005 songs
2005 singles
Akon songs
Dutch Top 40 number-one singles
European Hot 100 Singles number-one singles
Irish Singles Chart number-one singles
Music videos directed by Gil Green
Number-one singles in Australia
Number-one singles in Austria
Number-one singles in the Czech Republic
Number-one singles in Denmark
Number-one singles in Germany
Number-one singles in New Zealand
Number-one singles in Switzerland
Songs about loneliness
Songs written by Akon
Songs written by Bobby Vinton
SRC Records singles
UK Singles Chart number-one singles